Adelaide Augusta Keim (February 15, 1879 – June 25, 1946) was an American actress on Broadway and in vaudeville. She was known for playing the male title character in Hamlet in several American cities in 1905.

Early life 
Keim was born in New York City, the daughter of Henry (Harry) Grant Keim and Mary Agnes Morrissey Keim. Her father, a milliner by trade, was her manager, and manager of the Harlem Opera House. Her younger brother Chauncey Keim became a theatrical producer. Keim attended St. Joseph's Academy in New York.

Career 
Keim began her stage career being managed by Daniel Frohman in 1898 and appeared at his Lyceum Theatre. She appeared at such theatres as the Garden Theatre, Fifth Avenue Theatre and the Bijou Theatre. Keim's Broadway credits included roles in Trelawny of the 'Wells' (1898), At the White Horse Tavern and Twelve Months Later (1900), Terence (1904), The Prince of India (1906), and The Right to Happiness (1912). She was also active in touring stock companies and on the vaudeville stage. "I love the stage and would rather act than do anything else in the world," she told a Buffalo newspaper in 1911.

In 1905 Keim played the title role in Hamlet in Baltimore, New York and Chicago. "Miss Keim gave a thoughtful, impressive rendering of the Prince," said George C. Jenks in 1905, "but somehow you never could forget that it was a woman in man's clothes, and not the young man you were supposed to be looking at."

In 1918 she starred in Kate Douglas Wiggin's Mother Carey's Chickens in Maine.

Personal life 
Keim was involved with her Proctor's Theater costar Ned Howard Fowler in 1903, until her parents intervened, and both actors moved to other stock companies. She married another fellow actor, Allan Louis Murnane, in 1910. They lived in New Rochelle, New York, and had two children together, Adelaide (born 1914) and Allan (born 1921). She died in 1946, in her sixties.

References

External links 

 

1879 births
1946 deaths
American actresses
People from New Rochelle, New York